The Vuoksi (historically: "Uzerva"; ;) is a river running through the northernmost part of the Karelian Isthmus from Lake Saimaa in southeastern Finland to Lake Ladoga in northwestern Russia. The river enters Lake Ladoga in three branches, an older main northern branch at Priozersk (Käkisalmi), a smaller branch a few kilometers to the north of it, and a new southern branch entering  further southeast as Burnaya River (Finnish: Taipaleenjoki), which has become the main stream in terms of water discharge. Since 1857, the old northern distributaries drain only the lower reaches of the Vuoksi basin and are not fed by Lake Saimaa. The northern and southern branches actually belong to two separate river systems, which at times get isolated from each other in dry seasons.

The entire run of the river is  via the Priozersk branch, or  via the Taipale (Burnaya) branch. For most of its length, the river broadens out to a series of lakes bound together by shorter riverlike connections. One of these lakes, Uusijärvi close to Priozersk, was renamed Ozero Vuoksa ("Lake Vuoksa") by the Soviets.

The Vuoksi connects Lake Ladoga with central Finland, and was once an important route for trade and communication. A western branch, which disappeared due to ongoing land uplift, was an alternative route for the Karelians to reach the Gulf of Finland when the Neva River was blocked by enemies. Now the Saimaa Canal bypasses the Vuoksi and enters the Gulf of Finland in the Bay of Vyborg near the medieval city of Vyborg. 

During both the Winter and Continuation Wars the river Vuoksi was a major Finnish defensive line against the Soviet advance. The Mannerheim Line and VKT-line were located along the northern shore of its southern armlet. 

From the Industrial Revolution, power generated from Vuoksi's rapids made the Vuoksi region Finland's industrial center in the late 19th century. Since the Winter War (1940), the Karelian Isthmus has belonged to Russia and only  of the river's length remains in Finland. The major power stations at Tainionkoski and Imatra are on the Finnish side in the city of Imatra. 

The river's surroundings, including the Korela Fortress (formerly: Käkisalmi), is a popular resort for Saint Petersburg's residents. 

The river is famous for its rapids, for instance Imatrankoski in Imatra and rapid in the village of Losevo (Kiviniemi). The rapid junction of the Vuoksi and Suvanto/Lake Sukhodolskoye at Losevo is a popular area for kayak, canoe and catamaran competitions. 

A project is currently being discussed in Russia to destroy the rapids at Losevo and turn the River Burnaya, Lake Sukhodolskoye and lower portions of Vuoksi into a navigable canal, which would connect Lake Ladoga to the Gulf of Finland and allow oil tankers to bypass River Neva and the city of Saint Petersburg.

Geological history

Lake Ladoga transgressed, flooding lowland lakes and the Vuoksi, and connected with the Baltic Sea at Heinjoki, to the east of present-day Vyborg. Ladoga's level gradually sank and the River Neva, originating around 3100–2400 BP, drained its waters into the Gulf of Finland; but the Vuoksi still had a significant direct outflow connection to the Bay of Vyborg, possibly as late as in the 16th or 17th century AD. The connection disappeared due to ongoing land uplift.

Originally Lake Suvanto flowed into the Vuoksi through a waterway at Kiviniemi (now Losevo), but as a result of the change, the waterway dried out. In 1857 a channel was dug there, but the stream reversed direction, creating rapids and rendering navigation at Kiviniemi impossible.

References

External links

The creation of the Vuoksi River preceded a significant cultural shift, September 15, 2014, Phys.org

 
Rivers of Finland
Rivers of Leningrad Oblast
Karelian Isthmus
International rivers of Europe